Émile Argand (6 January 1879 – 14 September 1940) was a Swiss geologist.

He was born in Eaux-Vives near Geneva. He attended vocational school in Geneva then worked as a draftsman. He studied anatomy in Paris, but gave up medicine to pursue his interest in geology.

He was an early proponent of Alfred Wegener's theory of continental drift, viewing plate tectonics and continental collisions as the best explanation for the formation of the Alps. He is also noted for his application of the theory of tectonics to the continent of Asia.

He founded the Geological Institute of Neuchâtel, Switzerland.

Awards and honors
 1913 Spendiarov Prize
 1926 Marcel Benoist Prize
 A region of wrinkle ridges on the Moon was named Dorsa Argand after him.
 There is a road named "Rue Emile-Argand" at the University of Neuchâtel.
 Argandite, a mineral.

Bibliography
 Argand, E. (1924), "La Tectonique de l'Asie", Extrait du Compte-rendu du XIIIe Congrès géologique international 1922 (Liège), 1(5), pp. 171-372.
 Argand, E. (1916), "Sur l'arc des Alps Occidentales", Eclogae geologicae Helveticae (Lausanne), 14, pp. 145–192.
 Argand, E. (1911), "Les nappes de recouvrement des Alpes Pennines et leur prolongement structuraux", Mat. carte géol. Suisse, N.S., XXXI livr.

References

External links
 Historical perspective on the Alps, including illustrations by Argand.
Necrology (in French), in: Verhandlungen der Schweizerischen Naturforschenden Gesellschaft 120 (1940), 379-403.

1879 births
1940 deaths
20th-century Swiss geologists
Tectonicists